In molecular biology, the FAD dependent oxidoreductase family of proteins is a family of FAD dependent oxidoreductases. Members of this family include Glycerol-3-phosphate dehydrogenase , Sarcosine oxidase beta subunit , D-amino-acid dehydrogenase , D-aspartate oxidase .

D-amino acid oxidase  (DAMOX or DAO) is an FAD flavoenzyme that catalyses the oxidation of neutral and basic D-amino acids into their corresponding keto acids. DAOs have been characterised and sequenced in fungi and vertebrates where they are known to be located in the peroxisomes.

D-aspartate oxidase  (DASOX)  is an enzyme, structurally related to DAO, which catalyses the same reaction but is active only toward dicarboxylic D-amino acids. In DAO, a conserved histidine has been shown  to be important for the enzyme's catalytic activity.

See also
 DAO
 D-amino-acid dehydrogenase
 D-amino acid oxidase
 D-aspartate oxidase
 Glycerol-3-phosphate dehydrogenase
 Sarcosine oxidase

References

Protein domains
Molecular biology